Orchesellides is a genus of slender springtails in the family Entomobryidae. There is at least one described species in Orchesellides, O. sinensis.

References

Further reading

 
 
 

Collembola